Apachyus is a genus of earwigs, in the family Apachyidae. It is one of only two genera in Apachyidae. It has been cited by Henrik Steinmann in his book, The Animal Kingdom,  by G. K. Srivastava in Fauna of India, Part II, and by Chen & Ma in Fauna Sinica.

References

External links 
 The Earwig Research Centre's Apachyus database Instructions: type Apachyus in the "genus" field and click "search".

Dermaptera genera
Forficulina
Taxa named by Jean Guillaume Audinet-Serville